Spencer Freedman (born June 24, 1998) is an American college basketball player for the Harvard Crimson of the Ivy League. He attended Mater Dei High School in Santa Ana, California, where he was ranked among the top players in California. Freedman first competed with Santa Monica High School in his native Santa Monica, California.

High school career
Freedman played his freshman season at Santa Monica High School in Santa Monica, California. He joined the team as one of the top incoming freshman point guards, having drawn local attention at basketball camps and competitions in eighth grade. In his high school debut on June 12, 2014, Freedman scored 31 points, missing only two shots, in a win over Notre Dame High School. He notched 25 points in the following game. On January 24, 2015, he scored 17 points as his team was defeated by Las Vegas High School.

In June 2015, Freedman left Santa Monica to transfer to Mater Dei High School in Santa Ana, California. According to his father, he made the move for academic reasons. By the beginning of his Mater Dei career, he held college offers from the Cal State Northridge Matadors, Rice Owls, UC Santa Barbara Gauchos, and USC Trojans. On February 26, 2016, in a 54–102 loss to Chino Hills High School, Freedman scored 10 points. By the end of the season, he earned first-team All-County honors from the Orange County Register. His team was ranked among the top 25 in the nation by USA Today High School Sports.

In January 2017, in a win over Santa Margarita Catholic High School, Freedman posted 18 points and five assists for Mater Dei. He led his team to a Trinity League title and an appearance at the CIF Southern Section Open Division Finals. At the end of the season, he was named most valuable player of the Trinity League.

Recruiting
On June 9, Freedman committed to play college basketball for the Harvard Crimson. He said, "No matter what, eventually the ball is going to stop bouncing and basketball will be over for everyone so I know college is not a four decision but a lifetime decision. By choosing Harvard, I'm getting an education that will set me up for a future past basketball."

College career
Freedman made his debut for Harvard on November 6, 2018, scoring 6 points in a 78–66 win over MIT.

Over the course of his Harvard career he played in 32 games while starting in 3. Freedman totaled 81 points, 28 assists, and 20 rebounds while shooting a solid 30.6% from beyond the arc (three point).

After his career at Harvard he then decided to pursue a graduate degree in Management and Systems (School of Professional Studies) at New York University (NYU). At NYU he had an outstanding season leading the Violets to the DIII NCAA Tournament due to an at large bid and being named to 1st Team All-Conference in the UAA.

Career statistics

Harvard DI
 -- Total Points
|-
| style="text-align:left;"| 2018–19
| style="text-align:left;"| Harvard
| 16 || 2 || 12.1 || .310 || .333 || 1.000 || .5 || 1.2 || .1 || .0 || 2.8 -- 44 
|-
| style="text-align:left;"| 2019–20
| style="text-align:left;"| Harvard
| 16 || 1 || 7.9 || .40 || 26.9 || .50 || .8 || .6 || .2 || 0 || 2.3 -- 37  
|- class="sortbottom"
| style="text-align:center;" colspan="2"| Career
| 32 || 3 || 10.0 || .35 || .30 || .80 || .6 || .9 || .2 || .0 || 2.5 -- 81

New York University DIII
 -- Total Points
|-
| style="text-align:left;"| 2018–19
| style="text-align:left;"| Harvard
| 26 || 26 || 32.2 || 53.4 || 50.4 || 83.7 || 2.5 || 5.5 || 1.2 || .1 || 17.0 -- 441 |
|-

Personal life
Freedman was born in Pacific Palisades, Los Angeles to father Bryan Freedman, a lawyer who had studied at the University of California, Berkeley, and is Jewish. He first played basketball at age 7 and started training regularly one year later. In his junior year at Mater Dei, Freedman had a 4.3 grade point average (GPA) and drew attention from several Ivy League schools for his academic success. While in high school, he had plans to major in business, political science, or law.

References

External links
Spencer Freedman at Eurobasket.com
Spencer Freedman at RealGM

1998 births
Living people
Basketball players from Los Angeles
American men's basketball players
Jewish American sportspeople
Jewish men's basketball players
Point guards
Shooting guards
Harvard Crimson men's basketball players
21st-century American Jews